Ribosomal protein S6 kinase alpha-4 is an enzyme that in humans is encoded by the RPS6KA4 gene.

Function 

This gene encodes a member of the RSK (ribosomal S6 kinase) family of serine/threonine kinases. This kinase contains 2 non-identical kinase catalytic domains and phosphorylates various substrates, including CREB1 and c-Fos. Alternate transcriptional splice variants of this gene have been observed but have not been thoroughly characterized.

Interactions 

RPS6KA4 has been shown to interact with MAPK14.

References

Further reading 

EC 2.7.11